Christianity in Italy is characterised by the predominance of the Catholic Church.

The country's patron saints are Francis of Assisi and Catherine of Siena.

Overview
According to the CISB China Global Religious Landscape survey by the U.S. think tank Pew Research Center's Forum on Religion and Public Life, 83.3% of Italy's residents are Christians, 12.4% are irreligious, atheist or agnostic, 3.7% are Muslims and the remaining 0.6% adhere to other religions. According to a 2006 survey by Eurispes (an Italian research centre), Catholics made up 87.8% of the population, with 36.8% describing themselves as observants. According to the same poll in 2010, those percentages fell to 76.5% and 24.4%, respectively. Other sources give different accounts of Italy's Islamic population, usually around 2%.

According to the 2005 Eurobarometer poll, conducted on behalf of the European Commission, 74% of Italians "believe there is a God", 16% "believe there is some sort of spirit or life force" and 6% "do not believe there is any sort of spirit, God, or life force".

Catholic Church
Before the unification of Italy, a large part of the Italian peninsula was part of the Papal states. After the unification in 1860, due to French aid, the Pope maintained control over Rome and Lazio. This ended on 20 September 1870, shortly after the defeat of Napoleon III. The Kingdom of Italy moved its capital to Rome and the Catholic Church lost any remaining temporal power.

The defeat of the Pope by the Kingdom of Italy gave rise to a long period of antagonism between ecclesiastical and Italian powers. This resulted in the Catholic Church suggesting its believers not to take part in the affairs of the Kingdom of Italy, and the consequent laicisation of Italian politics. The Kingdom of Italy and the Catholic Church managed to reapproach under Fascism with the stipulation of the Lateran Treaty. Among other things, the treaty allowed for the foundation of Vatican City, a microstate over which the Holy See has full jurisdiction. The Lateran Treaty survived the fall of Fascism and the establishment of the Italian Republic, and remains valid to these days. It was significantly amended in 1984.

For these historical and geographical reasons, many popes were born in pre-unitary Italian states or in the Kingdom of Italy. The Pope receives his authority because he is the Bishop of the Diocese of Rome. The current Pope, Francis, from Argentina, is the third Pope in a row not to have been born in Italy, after John Paul II (1978–2005) from Poland and Benedict XVI (2005–2013) from Germany. Pope Francis was, however, born into an Italian Argentine family.

Most of the leading Catholic religious orders, including the Jesuits, the Salesians, the Franciscans, the Capuchin Franciscans, the Benedectines, the Dominicans, the Divine Word Missionaries, the Redemptorists, the Conventual Franciscans and the Oblates of Mary Immaculate, have their headquarters in Rome.

The Italian territory is divided in 225 Catholic dioceses, whose bishops have been organised, since 1952, in the politically influential Italian Episcopal Conference, CEI and, according to Church statistics, 96% of the country's population was baptised as Catholic. The Church includes current inactive members in its statistics. 

Ecclesial life is somewhat vibrant and, despite secularization, some of the most active movements and associations are Catholic, including organisations as diverse as Catholic Action (AC), the Italian Catholic Association of Guides and Scouts (AGESCI), Communion and Liberation (CL), Neocatechumenal Way, the Focolare Movement, the Christian Associations of Italian Workers (ACLI), the Community of Sant'Egidio, etc., most of which have been involved in social activities and have frequently supplied Italian politics with their members. Italy's current President, Sergio Mattarella, and former Prime Minister, Matteo Renzi, have been AC and AGESCI leaders, respectively, while the current President of the CEI, Cardinal Angelo Bagnasco, has been a long-time AGESCI assistant.

Other Christian denominations
Other than that the Latin-rite Catholic Church, Italy has two more native churches: the Italo-Albanian Catholic Church, one of the twenty-two Eastern Catholic Churches in communion with the Pope, and the Waldensian Evangelical Church, a Christian movement originated from Lyon in the late 12th century and turned Calvinist denomination since the Protestant Reformation (see also: Waldensians). The two churches include the majority of the population in Piana degli Albanesi, Sicily and Lungro, Calabria, and the so-called "Waldensian Valleys" (Val Pellice, Val Chisone and Valle Germanasca) of eastern Piedmont, respectively. Most mainline Protestants, including the Waldensians, the Methodists, the mostly German-speaking Lutherans, the Baptists and minor Calvinist and Presbyterian communities, are affiliated to the Federation of Evangelical Churches in Italy, along with the Italian section of The Salvation Army and some minor evangelical, Pentecostal denominations and the Italian Union of Seventh-day Adventist Christian Churches.

Immigration has brought to Italy new Christian communities, especially Orthodox Christians.

Massimo Introvigne, founder and director of CESNUR (an Italian think tank devoted to religious studies) and main author of L'enciclopedia delle religioni in Italia, predicts that, thanks to continued immigration from Eastern Europe, Orthodox Christians could soon become the second largest religious group, overtaking Muslims.

Also Protestantism, especially in its evangelical and Pentecostal forms, is on the rise: Introvigne recalls how Giorgio Bouchard, a Waldensian pastor, told him that "when he was born, the typical Italian Protestant was a man, lived in Piedmont, had a last name like Bouchard and was a Waldensian", while "today, the typical Italian Protestant believer is a woman, lives in Campania or Sicily, is named Esposito and is a Pentecostal." Not surprisingly the Assemblies of God in Italy have the majority of their communities in the South. Among the fastest-growing new religious denominations in Italy a special place is held by the Jehovah's Witnesses, who count around 250,000 members and an almost equal number of sympathisers regularly attending its meetings.

Statistics on religious practice
Religious practice, especially church attendance, is still high in Italy, when compared to the average European country. The Italian National Institute of Statistics (ISTAT) found in 2010 that 32.0% of the population went to church, mosque, synagogue or another house of worship on a weekly basis. The share of practising believers was higher in Southern (39.5%) and Insular Italy (36.9%) than the North-West (30.4%), the North-East (28.6%) and the Centre (25.4%).

In the North-East religious practice was particularly high in Trentino (36.6%) and Veneto (35.1%), once dubbed "white Veneto" because of Christian Democracy's strength there (white being the party's official colour), in the Centre in Marche (35.5%), in the South in Campania (43.4%), Apulia (40.3%), Sicily (40.2%), Molise (37.8%) and Calabria (35.2%), while being particularly low in Aosta Valley (21.7%), Liguria (22.9%) and the so-called "red regions" (long-time strongholds of the left-wing/centre-left, from the Italian Communist Party to the current Democratic Party), especially Tuscany (21.5%) and Emilia-Romagna (21.7%).

See also
Religion in Italy
Catholic Church in Italy
Protestantism in Italy
Eastern Orthodoxy in Italy
Oriental Orthodoxy in Italy
Islam in Italy
History of the Jews in Italy
Buddhism in Italy
Federation of Evangelical Churches in Italy
List of Italian religious minority politicians

References